Planaxidae, commonly called planaxids or clusterwinks, are a taxonomic family of small and minute sea snails, pantropical marine gastropod molluscs in the superfamily Cerithoidea. They live on rocky shores in the littoral zone of the tropics and subtropics.

Characteristics
Planaxids are known as clusterwinks because of their habit of clustering together in concealed, moist locations when the tide is out. They have conical shells resembling periwinkles, except for the wide, shallow anterior canals. They brood their embryos in a chamber behind their heads, releasing them into the sea as veliger larvae to form part of the plankton.

Subfamilies 
The following two subfamilies are recognized in the taxonomy of Bouchet & Rocroi (2005):
Planaxinae Gray, 1850
Fossarinae A. Adams, 1860 - previously in a family of its own, named Fossaridae

Genera
The family Planaxidae comprises the following genera:
The following genera are recognised:
Planaxinae
 † Cabania Lozouet & Senut, 1985 
 Fissilabia Macgillivray, 1836
 Halotapada Iredale, 1936
 Hinea Gray, 1847
 Holcostoma H. Adams & A. Adams, 1853
 † Leioplanaxis Lozouet & Maestrati, 1994 
 † Orthochilus Cossmann, 1889 
 Planaxis Lamarck, 1822
 Simulathena Houbrick, 1992
 Supplanaxis Thiele, 1929
Synonyms
 Angiola Dall, 1926: synonym of Hinea Gray, 1847
 Leucostoma Swainson, 1840: synonym of Fissilabia MacGillivray, 1836 (invalid: junior homonym of Leucostoma Meigen, 1803 [Diptera])
 Quoyia Gray, 1839: synonym of Fissilabia MacGillivray, 1836

Fossarinae
 Anafossarus Iredale, 1936
 Chilkaia Preston, 1915
 Fossarus Philippi, 1841
 Larinopsis J. H. Gatliff & C. J. Gabriel, 1916
 † Medoriopsis Cossmann, 1888 
  † Vouastia Raspail, 1909

Synonyms
 Fossar Gray, 1847: synonym of Fossarus Philippi, 1841 (invalid: unjustified emendation of Fossarus)
 Maravignia Aradas & Maggiore, 1844: synonym of Fossarus Philippi, 1841

References

 Strong E.E., Colgan D.J., Healy J.M., Lydeard C., Ponder W.F. & Glaubrecht M. (2011) Phylogeny of the gastropod superfamily Cerithioidea using morphology and molecules. Zoological Journal of the Linnean Society 162: 43–89.
  Bouchet P., Rocroi J.P., Hausdorf B., Kaim A., Kano Y., Nützel A., Parkhaev P., Schrödl M. & Strong E.E. (2017). Revised classification, nomenclator and typification of gastropod and monoplacophoran families. Malacologia. 61(1-2): 1-526.

External links 
 Gray, M. E., Figures of molluscous animals, selected from various authors. Longman, Brown, Green and Longmans, London. Vol. 4, iv + 219 pp. (August) 
 Houbrick R.S. 1987. Anatomy, Reproductive Biology, and Phylogeny of the Planaxidae (Cerithiacea: Prosobranchia). Smithsonian Contributions to Zoology 445: 1-57
 
 Powell A. W. B., New Zealand Mollusca, William Collins Publishers Ltd, Auckland, New Zealand 1979 
 GBIF

 
Gastropod families
Taxa named by John Edward Gray
Pantropical fauna